All India Peoples Science Network (AIPSN) is a national network of Peoples Science Movements of India. It was established in the first All India Peoples Science Congress, organised in 1988 at Kannur in Kerala State. The attempt to establish a national platform for science organisations in India started in the late 1960s. By that time, there were Science organisations in West Bengal, Assam, Orissa, Kerala and Maharashtra. In many other states, there were committed scientists who were interested to work with people for a social cause.

The first common platform of scientists was organised by working scientists of BARC in Mumbai. It was named the Federation of Indian Literary Scientists Association. They supported different groups of scientists in different language speaking states with science writings in the vernacular. In 1973 and 1978, regional conferences of scientists were organised in Bangalore and Thiruvananthapuram. As a result, organisations were formed in few other states also. By the 1970s, there was Assam Science Society in Assam, Bangeeya Vigyan Parishad in West Bengal, Kerala Sastra Sahitya Parishad in Kerala and Karnataka Rajya Vijnan Parishad in Karnataka. The Bhopal Gas Tragedy of 1984 created a situation for these groups to work together against abuse of science and technology and lot of such activities were organised. In 1987, five national kala jathas were organised in the name Bharat Jan Vijnana Jatha which culminated in Bhopal. Following this, organisations sprouted in various states which created a conducive atmosphere for the establishment of the All India Peoples Science Network.

When All India Peoples Science Network was established in February 1988, there were 28 member organisations and presently, it has 35 members. It functions as a common platform for interaction on science and technology issues and learning. It organises All India Peoples Sciences Congress every two years to discuss various experiences in science and technology. The organisational conference of the network is held along with the congress.

Members

Major activities

1)	Science Communication and Publication
2)	Health
3)	Education
4)	Environment, Energy and Sustainable Development
5)	Agriculture 
6)	Rural Technology
7)	Decentralization
8)	Samata
9)	Cultural Communication

See also
Children's Indradanush

References

External links
"Secularism and People's Science Movement in India" and "Towards a People's Science Movement" from Economic and Political Weekly
"People's Science Movement" from Science, technology, imperialism, and war

"The People's Science Movements" from Knowing Nature
"Science for social change"

Scientific organisations based in India
Social movements in India